The Little Pokororo River is a river of the Tasman Region of New Zealand's South Island. Like its neighbour the Pokororo River it is a tributary of the Motueka River, which it meets 15 kilometres southwest of Motueka.

See also
List of rivers of New Zealand

References

Rivers of the Tasman District
Rivers of New Zealand